Klausen may refer to:

 Klausen, Germany, an Ortsgemeinde in Rhineland-Palatinate
 Klausen, South Tyrol, a municipality in Italy
 Klausen Pass, Switzerland
 Klausen (surname)